Déiber Jair Caicedo Mideros (born 25 March 2000) is a Colombian professional footballer who plays as a winger for Major League Soccer club Vancouver Whitecaps FC.

Career
Caicedo represented Colombia at the 2017 FIFA U-17 World Cup, scoring in a 3-1 victory against the United States.

Vancouver Whitecaps FC
On January 26, 2021, the Vancouver Whitecaps FC acquired Caicedo from Deportivo Cali, the club announced they acquired his discovery rights from Nashville SC for $75,000 General Allocation Money. It was also announced that Caicedo signed a contract with Vancouver through 2023 with a club option for 2024.

Career statistics

Honours 
 Vancouver Whitecaps FC Most Promising Male Player: 2021

References

External links
 Déiber Caicedo at FIFA

2000 births
Living people
Colombian footballers
Association football forwards
Deportivo Cali footballers
Categoría Primera A players
Colombia youth international footballers
People from Barbacoas, Nariño
Major League Soccer players
Vancouver Whitecaps FC players
Sportspeople from Nariño Department
Colombia under-20 international footballers